It Must Be Love is a 1926 American silent comedy film directed by Alfred E. Green and starring Colleen Moore, Jean Hersholt and Malcolm McGregor.

Plot
Fernie Schmidt (Colleen Moore) lives with her parents in the rear of their delicatessen. The smells of the business - cheeses, sausages, garlic and pickled herrings - repulses Fernie, who dreams of removing herself from the environment and moving into a life with a more rarified. Her father, Pop Schmidt (Jean Hersholt) has plans for his daughter to marry Peter Halitovsky (Arthur Stone), a sausage salesman, but Fernie is repulsed by the idea. At a dance, Fernie meets Jack Dugan (Malcolm McGregor), who tells her that he is in stocks, a paper-counter, and she falls for him. Because of her rejection of her father's chosen candidate for matrimony, Pop puts Fernie out of the house.

Fernie manages to find works as a counter girl in a department store. Luckily, the job is at the perfume counter. Jack, in due course, proposes to Fernie. Before she can give her answer, she is invited back home by Pop for dinner, at which time he announces he is going to buy a new home, removing himself from the back of the fragrant delicatessen. Peter is there and he proposes to her, but before she can reject him Jack appears on the scene, declaring that he has purchased a delicatessen business. Seeing that marrying jack would return her to the life she wishes to flee, she finds herself resolved to the fate of marrying her father's choice of husband, Peter.

Cast
 Colleen Moore as Fernie Schmidt  
 Jean Hersholt as Pop Schmidt  
 Malcolm McGregor as Jack Dugan  
 Arthur Stone as Peter Halitovsky 
 Bodil Rosing as Mom Schmidt  
 Dorothy Seastrom as Min  
 Cleve Moore as Al  
 Mary O'Brien as Lois 
 Ray Hallor as Joe

References

Bibliography
 Monaco, James. The Encyclopedia of Film. Perigee Books, 1991.

External links

1926 films
1926 comedy films
Silent American comedy films
Films directed by Alfred E. Green
American silent feature films
1920s English-language films
First National Pictures films
American black-and-white films
1920s American films